Oncodamus is a genus of spiders in the family Nicodamidae. It was first described in 1995 by Harvey. , it contains 2 Australian species.

References

Nicodamidae
Araneomorphae genera
Spiders of Australia